Marco Bosisio (born 18 April 2002) is an Italian professional footballer who plays as a centre-back for  club Bari.

Club career
Bosisio was raised in the youth teams of AC Milan and represented the club in the 2021–22 UEFA Youth League.

On 2 July 2022, Bosisio signed a three-year contract with Bari in Serie B. He made his Serie B debut for Bari on 12 August 2022 in a game against Parma.

References

External links
 

Living people
2002 births
People from Vimercate
Sportspeople from the Province of Monza e Brianza
Italian footballers
Association football defenders
Serie B players
S.S.C. Bari players